Marcos-Antonio Serrano Rodríguez (born 8 September 1972 in Redondela, Province of Pontevedra) is a professional cyclist from Galicia, Spain. Turning professional in 1993, he joined the Kelme team and then in 1999 the lottery-sponsored Organización Nacional de Ciegos Españoles (ONCE). He remained part of the same team when in 2004 sponsorship and name passed to Liberty Seguros-Würth and in 2006, as the Astana-Würth Team.

His most significant achievement was victory in the Milano–Torino in 2004. Other palmarès include victory in the 18th stage of the 2005 Tour de France and in the 5th stage of the 1999 Tour of Galicia. His best overall classification in the Tour de France was a ninth-place finish in 2001.

His name was on the list of doping tests published by the French Senate on 24 July 2013 that were collected during the 1998 Tour de France and found positive for EPO when retested in 2004.

References

External links
Palmarès at Trap-Friis.dk

1972 births
Living people
Sportspeople from Redondela
Cyclists from Galicia (Spain)
Spanish Tour de France stage winners
Spanish male cyclists